Pittsfield High School may refer to:

Pittsfield High School (Illinois)
Pittsfield High School (Massachusetts)